Takht-e Sofla (also Romanized as Takht-e Soflá; also known as Takht and Takht-e Pā’īn) is a village in Charuymaq-e Sharqi Rural District, Shadian District, Charuymaq County, East Azerbaijan Province, Iran. At the 2006 census, its population was 87, in 15 families.

References 

Populated places in Charuymaq County